The Ladies' Literary Club Building, also known as the William M. Davis House or the Arden H. Ballard House, was built as a private home, and is currently used as the meeting place for the Ladies' Literary Club.  It is located at 218 North Washington Street Ypsilanti, Michigan. It was designated a Michigan State Historic Site in 1965 and listed on the National Register of Historic Places in 1972.

Early history
The Ladies' Literary Club Building was built in approximately 1843 as a home for William M. Davis.  It was likely designed by Arden H. Ballard and built by his firm of Norris, Cross, and Ballard.  At some point, it was sold to Elijah Grant, who operated a local dry goods store.  When Grant died in 1851, his wife Mary and son Edward continued to live in the house.  Mary died in 1883, and Edward continued to live in the house, his fortune slowly diminishing through a series of bad investments.  He eventually began selling the furnishings, and in 1913 sold the house itself.  The Ladies' Literary Club purchased the property to use as their meeting hall.

Ladies' Literary Club
The Ladies' Literary Club of Ypsilanti was founded in 1878 by Sarah Smith Putnam, with 17 members. The club functioned as a learning society. Since learning opportunities for women remained few  clubwomen developed courses of study in various historical topics from the French Revolution to early Greek and Roman societies. The club membership quickly expanded, and they held bi-monthly meetings at the homes of members or in the library. However, by 1910, the club had grown large enough that they needed to rent rooms in the Masonic temple. When the Davis House was put up for sale in 1913, the Club purchased it for $3000.  The first meeting in the house was in October 1914.

The interior of the building was later refurbished under the oversight of architect Emil Lorch.  In the 1930s, Lorch helped the structure become a part of the Historic American Buildings Survey "because of its age and architectural interest as being worthy of most careful preservation for future generations."   More remodeling was done in 1955, and an addition was built to the rear of the building in 1971–72.

Description
The Ladies' Literary Club Building is a -story rectangular brick Greek Revival house. The temple front boasts a wooden tetrastyle Doric portico with a triangular pediment above.  A single story wooden wing sits to one side.  Grills are placed along the frieze.

References

External links

Ladies' Literary Club of Ypsilanti

Clubhouses on the National Register of Historic Places in Michigan
Greek Revival houses in Michigan
Houses completed in 1843
Houses in Washtenaw County, Michigan
Michigan State Historic Sites in Washtenaw County, Michigan
1843 establishments in Michigan
National Register of Historic Places in Washtenaw County, Michigan
Buildings and structures in Ypsilanti, Michigan